Ayr ("Mouth of the River Ayr") is a town situated on the southwest coast of Scotland. It is the administrative centre of the South Ayrshire council area and the historic county town of Ayrshire. With a population of 46,982 Ayr is the 16th largest settlement in Scotland and second largest town in Ayrshire by population. The town is contiguous with the smaller town of Prestwick to the north.

Ayr was established as a Royal Burgh in 1205 and is the county town of Ayrshire. It served as Ayrshire's central marketplace and harbour throughout the Medieval Period and was a well-known port during the Early Modern Period.

On the southern bank of the River Ayr sits the ramparts of a citadel constructed by Oliver Cromwell's men during the mid-17th century. Towards the south of the town is the birthplace of Scottish poet Robert Burns in the suburb of Alloway. Ayr has been a popular tourist resort since the expansion of the railway in 1840 owing to the town's fine beach and its links to golfing and Robert Burns.

Ayr is one of the largest retail centres in the south of Scotland and was recognised as the second healthiest town centre in the United Kingdom by the Royal Society for Public Health in 2014. Ayr has hosted the Scottish Grand National horseracing steeplechase annually since 1965 and the Scottish International Airshow annually since 2014. The town also accommodates the headquarters of the Ayr Advertiser and Ayrshire Post newspapers.

Notable people should also include
Alex Bell 1882-1934 footballer Ayr Parkhouse and Manchester United.

Etymology
The name Ayr can be traced back to a pre-Celtic word meaning "watercourse" or "strong river". This name was used before the establishment of the Julian calendar in reference to the River Ayr. The town was formerly known as 'Inverair' or 'Inverayr', meaning "mouth of the river Ayr", yet this was later abbreviated to 'Air', and then to 'Ayr'. Elements of the old name remain present within the Scottish Gaelic name for Ayr – Inbhir Air.

History

Pre-establishment
The areas surrounding modern day Ayr were known to have been occupied by Mesolithic hunter-gathers more than 5,000 years ago. There is also a Neolithic standing stone at the end of Stonefield Park in Doonfoot, which is believed to have been upended as a place of sun worship by Stone Age people.

Establishment and early settlement

In 1197, King William the Lion ordered that a new castle be built between the River Ayr and the River Doon. It is believed that the castle was a wooden structure built around Montgomerie Terrace. Ayr was later established as a royal burgh and market town on 21 May 1205 by King William the Lion. At its establishment, the burgh encompassed a single street (The Sandgate) and the Church of St John. By 1225 the town reached as far as Carrick Street and Mill Street along the south side of the River Ayr. The town grew quickly to become the main seaport, marketplace and administrative centre for Ayrshire.

The King gifted fishing rights to the burgh for the River Ayr and the River Doon in 1236. In the following year, a timber bridge was built across the River Ayr, linking the town to the north side of the River. Since 1261, annual fairs were held in the town. At this time the town had a recorded population of 1,500 and served as a major port on the west coast. The town was unsuccessfully attacked by Norwegian forces in 1263 and invaded and occupied by English forces from 1296 until 1312 as part of the Scottish Wars of Independence. In 1298 the original castle at Ayr was destroyed by Robert The Bruce's forces. On 26 April 1315, a Parliament of Scotland was held in Ayr by Robert The Bruce at St. John's Tower by the sea.

As a Royal Burgh, Ayr was afforded various privileges relating to trade, tolls and fishing rights, which allowed the town to out-compete the neighbouring free burgh of Newton-on-Ayr which was established in the 14th century and situated on the north side of the River Ayr.

Early modern period

Ayr was continuously hit by a number of plagues from 1545 to 1647, resulting in the town's port being quarantined and plague victims being removed from the town on pain of death. Mary, Queen of Scots visited the town in 1552 and 1563. Ayr remained a significant port throughout the 16th century, exporting goods such as fish, hide and wool and importing salt and wine.

Ayr played a pivotal role in the Plantation of Ulster throughout the 17th century, in which a significant number of British people settled in present-day Northern Ireland. The town provided the largest share of colonists from Great Britain, with many colonists from Ayr joining the Earl of Eglinton, Hugh Montgomery's, plant in the Ards Peninsula (particularly around Newtownards), and others going on to settle around Belfast. In 1652, the town was used as a base and fortress for some of Oliver Cromwell's men. They established a large fortress along the mouth of the River Ayr and erected walls around the area just south of the River's mouth – most of these walls remain present to this day. St John's Tower, which sat around the centre of the fortress, was originally part of a large church yet this was knocked down during the construction of the fort with the tower being used for military practice; it is now protected by "Friends Of Saint Johns Tower" (FROST) residents in the "Ayr Fort Area" which sits atop the former site of the citadel.

The lands occupied by the fort were granted to the Earl of Eglinton, Alexander Montgomerie, in 1663, who established the separate Burgh of Regality named Montgomerieston around the fort, which was eventually absorbed into the Burgh of Ayr. The separate village of Alloway to the south-east of Ayr was also annexed by the town in 1691, despite numerous petitions against this to Edinburgh from residents of the village. Although the importation of French wine continued to be Ayr's most important trade during the 17th century, the port was one of the first in Scotland to establish regular trade links with the English colonies in the Americas. This commenced during the 1640s when the English Civil War disrupted established colonial trading arrangements, and during the Cromwellian occupation there was free trade between Scotland and the English colonies. Following the 1660 Restoration of the monarchy, the Navigation Acts excluded Scottish ships from this trade apart from a few exceptional cases. Several English merchants had settled in Ayr during the Cromwellian occupation, and they collaborated with local merchants in circumventing the Navigation Acts by disguising Ayr ships as English vessels. Tobacco, sugar and indigo were imported, and salted fish, meat, clothing and indentured servants were exported.

Deposits of coal were found and mined in Newton during the 17th century, resulting in the town becoming a base for the industry, with coal being exported abroad from its harbour. At this time, Ayr's population is estimated to have been at around 2,000.

By the late 17th century and early 18th century, Ayr was widely regarded as a town in decline, with Daniel Defoe remarking in A tour thro' the whole island of Great Britain "The capital of this country is Air, a sea-port, and as they tell us, was formerly a large city, had a good harbour, and a great trade: I must acknowledge to you, that tho' I believe it never was a city, yet it has certainly been a good town, and much bigger than it is now: At present like an old beauty, it shews the ruins of a good face; but is also apparently not only decay'd and declin'd, but decaying and declining every day, and from being the fifth town in Scotland, as the townsmen say, is now like a place so saken; the reason of its decay, is, the decay of its trade, so true is it, that commerce is the life of nations, of cities towns, harbours, and of the whole prosperity of a country: What the reason of the decay of trade here was, or when it first began to decay, is hard to determine; nor are the people free to tell, and, perhaps, do not know themselves. There is a good river here, and a handsome stone bridge of four arches."

Acts of Union

The formation of the Kingdom of Great Britain through the Acts of Union 1707 was initially harmful to Ayr, due to the importance to its economy of the wine trade with France. The terms of the English Methuen Treaty of 1703, which favoured the importation of Portuguese and Spanish wines and was accompanied by punitive duties on French wines, were extended to Scotland. However, the Union provided Ayr with significant trading opportunities with Britain's colonies around the world and resulted in improvements to the town's infrastructure, with Ayr's textile, wool, linen and shoemaking industries thriving as a result. A small lighthouse was constructed on the River Ayr in 1712, followed by a quay in 1713. Repairs to the town's Harbour and High Tolbooth took place between 1724 and 1726, with funding provided by the Convention of Royal Burghs. Street lighting was installed around the town centre in 1747. A sugar refinery at the harbour was in operation during the 1770s.

The grounds of Alloway were sold in 1754 to help pay off Ayr burgh's public debts, resulting in the establishment of the Belleisle and Rozelle estates to the south of the town, which are now public parks. Rozelle was acquired by Robert Hamilton, who named his estate after one of his plantations in Jamaica. In 1760, Wallacetown was formed to the east of Newton by the Wallaces of Craigie House. Ayr Racecourse was established in 1777. The "New Brig" of Ayr was constructed in 1785–88 and rebuilt in 1877 after severe flooding. In 1792 and 1817, Parliament passed acts to deepen and maintain Ayr's Harbour. During this period Ayr's population was estimated to be around 4,000.

A permanent military presence was established in the town with the completion of Ayr Barracks (later known as Churchill Barracks) on the citadel site in 1795. Ayr Town Hall was designed by Thomas Hamilton and completed in 1832.

In 1801, the parish of Ayr had a recorded population of just under 5,500, with the adjoining burgh of Newton to the north having a population of just under 1,700 people. By 1826 Ayr's streets were lit by gas and by 1842 Ayr had a water supply, with sewers being dug soon after. Ayr was connected to Glasgow, and thus the rest of Great Britain, by rail in 1839, with the first service operating in August 1840 to a terminus on North Harbour Street. This led to a significant expansion in Ayr's tourist industry due to its attractive, sandy beach and links to Robert Burns. In 1857 a line was built from Dalmellington to export iron from Waterside and a new station was built to replace the old station called "Ayr Townhead Station". In 1877 a line was built between Newton and Mauchline for the export of coal. By 1851 Ayr's population was 21,000 and by 1855 between 60,000 and 70,000 tonnes of coal were being exported to Ireland from Ayr's Harbour each year, with imports of hide and tallow coming into the harbour from South America and beef, butter, barley, yarn and linen being imported into the harbour from Ireland. In 1854, 84,330 tonnes of goods were exported from the town and 36,760 tonnes were imported into the town. Other prominent industries in Ayr at this time included fishing, tanning and shoemaking, with several sawmills, woollen mills and carpet weavers located in the town as well. Timber and tobacco were also traded between Ayr's Harbour and North America.

The Burgh of Ayr Act 1873 resulted in Newton and Wallacetown being absorbed into the Burgh of Ayr. Newton's more industrial character has left the town today divided into two distinct areas, with areas south of the River Ayr incorporating a mixture of affluent Victorian residential suburbs and modern suburban developments, in contrast to more deprived and industrial areas to the north of the river.  When elected county councils were created in 1890 under the Local Government (Scotland) Act 1889, the burgh of Ayr was deemed capable of running its own affairs and so was excluded from the jurisdiction of Ayrshire County Council, although the county council chose to meet at County Buildings in the town. The Carnegie Library was opened in Ayr on 2 September 1893. By the turn of the century, Ayr's population was around 31,000 people. The Burns Statue Square drill hall was completed in 1901 and the Wellington Square drill hall was probably completed shortly after that.

On 26 September 1901, a tram service was opened between Prestwick Cross in Prestwick and St Leonards in Ayr. This was expanded south the following year to Alloway, and east in 1913 to the Racecourse at Whitletts. The tram service was eventually shut due to expensive repair costs, with the last tram running on New Year's Eve in 1931.

Modern history

817 men from Ayr died during the First World War. A memorial was unveiled at Wellington Square in 1924 dedicated to those who died, with other memorials being put up at Alloway Village Hall and Whitletts Cross.

Ayr's growing population following the war resulted in significant slum clearance and redevelopment around the town centre, with the development of new housing estates on the periphery of the town. The lands surrounding Woodfield House were acquired by the council in 1919 to build council housing on, with the first residents moving in 1921. Further local government reform in 1930 brought the burgh of Ayr within the area controlled by Ayrshire County Council, but classed as a large burgh, which allowed the town to continue to run many local services itself. The burgh boundaries were expanded in 1935 to include Alloway, Castlehill, Doonfoot and Whitletts. In the 1930s, council estates were also developed at Lochside and Heathfield. The mining villages of Dalmilling and Whitletts were also cleared and developed into sizeable council estates.

Following the Second World War, more council housing was developed in Ayr at Kincaidston, with the Wallacetown and Whitletts estates being expanded. Suburban housing was also developed at Alloway, Doonfoot and Holmston, and many disused industrial buildings throughout the town were redeveloped into flats.

Archaeology 
In 2019, GUARD Archaeology team led by Iraia Arabaolaza uncovered a marching camp dating to the 1st century AD, used by Roman legions during the invasion of Roman General Agricola. According to Arabaolaza, the fire pits were split 30 meters apart into two parallel lines. The findings also included clay-domed ovens and 26 fire pits dated to between 77- 86 AD and 90 AD loaded with burn and charcoal contents. Archaeologists suggested that this site had been chosen as a strategic location for the Roman conquest of Ayrshire.

Governance

UK Parliament

Ayr was represented by a Conservative MP continuously for a period of 91 years – from 1906 (as part of the Ayr Burghs constituency) until 1997, followed by Labour from 1997 to 2015, and the Scottish National Party from 2015 to 2017. The town forms part of the Ayr constituency in the Scottish Parliament, which was the first Conservative constituency seat in the Parliament, but has been represented by Scottish National Party (SNP) MSP Siobhian Brown since the 2021 Scottish Parliament election. In the UK Parliament, Ayr is situated within the Ayr, Carrick and Cumnock constituency which was represented by Conservative MP Bill Grant from the 2017 general election, until he was unseated in the 2019 general election by Allan Dorans of the Scottish National Party.

Ayr forms part of the UK Parliamentary constituency of Ayr, Carrick and Cumnock. This constituency includes Carrick and Coylton in South Ayrshire in addition to Doon Valley, Cumnock and New Cumnock in southern East Ayrshire. The seat was held by Conservative Bill Grant from 2017 until 2019 when Allan Dorans gained the seat for the Scottish National Party.

The Central Ayrshire constituency runs north of the Ayr, Carrick and Cumnock constituency. It takes in the towns of Irvine, Kilwinning, Prestwick, Troon and rural Kyle, running into Annbank. It also incorporates the Woodfield area of Newton-on-Ayr and is represented by SNP MP Philippa Whitford.

In previous elections Ayr was represented in Westminster as part of the Ayr Parliamentary constituency, the boundaries of which included elements of Prestwick, Troon and rural South Ayrshire. The seat was abolished in 2005 to be replaced by the Ayr, Carrick and Cumnock and Central Ayrshire constituencies which were subsequently represented by MP's belonging to Labour, and later, the SNP. From the seat's creation in 1950 until the 1997 general election Ayr was continually represented by MP's from the Conservative Party. George Younger served as Member of Parliament for the constituency for most of this period – serving as MP for Ayr from 1964 to 1992. In 1997 the boundaries of the constituency were altered in a move which saw the Conservative areas of Alloway, Doonfoot and Masonhill alongside parts of Kincaidston and Forehill being transferred to the neighbouring Carrick, Cumnock and Doon Valley constituency, benefiting the Labour Party.

Prior to this Ayr formed part of the Ayr Burghs constituency which combined various towns along the Ayrshire coast such as Irvine, Troon, Prestwick, Ardrossan and Saltcoats: this seat was held by the Conservatives from 1906 until the constituency's abolishment in 1950, making Ayr the longest seat to be held by the Conservatives in Scotland at over 100 years.

Scottish Parliament

In the Scottish Parliament, the Ayr constituency was represented from 2000 to 2021 by Conservative MSP John Scott until he was defeated at the 2021 election by the SNP's Siobhian Brown. It was the first constituency in the Scottish Parliament to elect a Conservative MSP. The constituency also includes the towns of Prestwick and Troon.

Ayr is also represented at Holyrood by the seven MSPs for the South Scotland electoral region.

Council elections

Ayr is represented by 11 elected councillors on South Ayrshire Council, of which five belong to the Scottish Conservatives, four belong to the Scottish National Party and two belong to Scottish Labour. Below are a list of councillors elected to serve Ayr, sorted by ward:

As a former Royal Burgh, Ayr had a Provost as chief magistrate of the burgh council and the earliest recorded Provost is Nicholas de Fynvyk. The title of provost was retained by Kyle and Carrick District Council and South Ayrshire Council for their civic heads. The role of provost is now apolitical and carries a number of duties including chairing meetings of the council, acting as civic head representing South Ayrshire Council, promotion of South Ayrshire Council and networking with various organisations such as local businesses.

A chain and robes are worn by the provost while undertaking their ceremonial duties. The Provost's chain was donated in June 1897 by James McLennan who was a Glasgow wine and spirit merchant who was born in Coylton and lived in Ayr. The official provost's robes have been provided by the council since 11 June 1923. In addition, South Ayrshire Council erects lamp posts with the Royal Burgh Coat of Arms emblazoned on the diffusers outside the official resident of the provost – this has been undertaken since 1854.

Each newly elected provost enters their name into a Bible at the "Kirkin 'O The Council" service at Ayr Auld Kirk after each council election. The Bible in which the names are entered was acquired by the Kirk during the Provostship of Hugh Miller (1841–1855). The names of the provosts entered into the Bible are as follows:

The current provost is Labour councillor Helen Moonie.
List of Provosts of Ayr from 1560 to 1692, See Annals of Ayr in the olden time, 1560–1692, By John Pagan. Ayr: Alex Fergusson, 18 High Street, 1897.

Geography
 
Ayr is a coastal town which lies on the mouth of the River Ayr. The river then flows out into the larger Firth of Clyde estuary. From the coast, the Isle of Arran can be seen, and on a very clear day, the northern tip of Northern Ireland. It is within the region of Strathclyde. Much of the land in and around this area is very flat and low lying, used for rearing dairy cattle. Towards the south of Ayr, however, the land is higher than most areas in the county of Ayrshire, an example of this being the Brown Carrick Hill which is situated due south of Doonfoot.

The urban area which encompasses Ayr is defined by the General Register Office for Scotland as the adjoining localities of Ayr and Prestwick − this is the 12th largest urban area in Scotland.

Location

Areas of Ayr

Climate

The area experiences very cool summers and somewhat mild winters. The air is cooler during the summer due to its proximity to the sea as water has a major cooling effect on summer temperatures. During the winter months the reverse happens and the sea air has a major warming effect on the climate. The area rarely sees extremes, owing to the effects of sea air. Rainfall is generally plentiful throughout the year due to Atlantic weather systems sweeping in from the west. Compared with the rest of Scotland, the area rarely sees much mist and fog. This is because the land is relatively flat and low lying and with the wind blowing across the flatter land, this generally hinders fog from developing widely. This has made Glasgow Prestwick International Airport particularly well known as one of the less fog-prone airports in Scotland. Snowfall is rare in this part of Scotland because of the mild sea air.

Economy

The north side of Ayr Harbour still operates as a commercial port, mainly exporting coal, and extensive railway sidings still lead down from the main railway line near Newton-on-Ayr station.

Ayr developed as the central retail hub in the south-west of Scotland after the opening of the town's first department store, Hourstons, in 1896. In the 1970s the opening of stores such as Marks and Spencers and Ayr's first shopping centre, the Kyle Centre (1988), encouraged an expansion in the local economy. Heathfield Retail park, an out-of-town retail park, opened in 1993 with shops such as Halfords and Homebase. Ayr Central Shopping Centre opened in March 2006, housing shops such as Debenhams and H&M and under-parking for 500 cars. In December 2014 Threesixty Architecture received planning permission to refurbish the Kyle Centre by reinventing it as a centre of leisure through the creation of a new cinema complex among other new features. As of 2014 Royal Society for Public Health found Ayr's High Street to be the second healthiest in the United Kingdom behind Shrewsbury. In 2016 research conducted by the Local Data Company suggested that Ayr had among the highest number of shops per head in the United Kingdom at one shop for every 270 people.

During the 19th and 20th centuries, Ayr became a popular holiday resort. This was due to its fine sandy beach and the construction of the rail link to Glasgow which was completed in 1840.

To the north of Ayr is the adjoining town of Prestwick, which is known for its golf and aviation industries thanks to the presence of Glasgow Prestwick Airport. Ayr has three golf courses in Bellisle, Seafield and Dalmilling, as well as a private course called St Cuthberts. The area is synonymous as a seaside resort, with the south of the town housing the Craig Tara and Haven (formerly Butlins) holiday parks. The suburban village of Alloway to the south of the town is also well established for its associations with the poet Robert Burns. Further south, the fishing village of Dunure takes in a ruined castle which was formerly owned by the Kennedy family.

In 1973, Ayr hosted the Royal National Mòd. Ayr has hosted the Scottish Grand National horse-racing steeplechase annually since 1966 and the Scottish International Airshow since 2014.

Transport
.
Ayr is served by several major roads:
 A77 – forming the Ayr bypass, part of the trunk route between Glasgow and Stranraer. The bypass was built in 1971.
 A79 – the former A77 before the bypass was opened, now the main road running through Ayr and linking Ayr with Prestwick and its airport.
 A70 – running east from Ayr to Cumnock, Lanark and Edinburgh.
 A713 – running southeast to Dalmellington and Castle Douglas.
 A719 – running northeast to Galston and southwest along the coast to Turnberry.

Eight local bus services operated by Stagecoach West Scotland serve Ayr and Prestwick. Express coaches to Glasgow Buchanan Street operate every 30–60 minutes. Ulsterbus operate bus services to Belfast via Stranraer Ferry service on Stena Line.

The Ayr railway station has regular services to Glasgow Central station, Edinburgh Waverley, Stranraer, Girvan and Kilmarnock. All services are operated by ScotRail.

The railway station provides rail and sea connections via Stranraer for the connecting bus to Cairnryan for either the Stena Line ferry service to the Port of Belfast or the P&O Ferries service to Larne Harbour connecting with Northern Ireland Railways via Carrickfergus and Jordanstown to Belfast Central and Belfast Great Victoria Street.  There is also the connection via Troon on P&O Ferries on a seasonal basis to Larne Harbour.

Further destinations are available from Glasgow Airport, which is accessible by train to Paisley Gilmour Street for the connecting bus to the airport.

Although the town does not have any ferry services from its harbour, it is in close proximity to ferry services to Northern Ireland.

Religion

The Church of Scotland is the main denomination in Ayr with nine churches spread throughout the town. The Roman Catholic Church has two churches, St Paul's, Belmont and the Cathedral Church of St Margaret  the successor to The Good Shepherd Cathedral which has been demolished.

There is also a Free Church of Scotland, a Baptist Church and Evangelical church in John Street, a Latter-Day Saints Church at Orchard Avenue and the Southside Christian Fellowship in Ayr Town Hall.

Demography
At the United Kingdom Census 2001, Ayr had a population of 46,431, a fall of −3.2% on 1991. Mid-2008 population estimates placed the total resident population at 46,070 making Ayr the 12th largest urban area in Scotland. The 2011 census found that Ayr's population had grown by around 0.9% since the 2001 census – surpassing the total population growth of Ayr and Prestwick, which only grew by 0.63%, falling short of the national population growth of Scotland of +4.61%.

In 2001, nearly 0.36% (167) people in the town could speak Scottish Gaelic – this fell to 0.34% (161) in 2011. South Ayrshire Council provides no educational support for the language.

Education

Ayr has two nursery schools:
 Cherry Tree Early Years Centre
 Wallacetown Early Years Centre
There are also several partnership centres and nursery classes held within primary schools within Ayr.

Ayr is served by fifteen primary schools:

Ayr has one school which provides education for those with Additional Support Needs:
 Southcraig Campus

Ayr is served by four secondary schools:
 Ayr Academy
 Belmont Academy
 Kyle Academy
 Queen Margaret Academy (denominational)
Prestwick Academy is located within the neighbouring town of Prestwick and provides education to pupils who are resident within Ayr but fall within its catchment area.
Mainholm Academy was a former secondary school located within Ayr and was closed due to safety concerns.

Ayr is served by one independent school that provides both primary and secondary education:
 Wellington School

Ayr has four further education establishments:
 Ayrshire College (previously known as Ayr College and prior to that, Ayr Technical College)
 University of the West of Scotland (formerly known as the University of Paisley)
 Scotland's Rural College
 Adult Learning Centre

Public services

The NHS Ayrshire and Arran Health Board serves South, East and North Ayrshire – a part of Ayrshire and Arran's departmental headquarters is located in Ayr. Ayr is also the regional headquarters of the Scottish Ambulance Service for south-west Scotland that is located in Heathfield, next to the site of the old Heathfield Hospital.

Ayr previously had four hospitals: Heathfield Hospital (originally a fever hospital, but latterly medical and ophthalmic), Seafield Children's Hospital (a pediatric hospital), Ayr County Hospital (originally a voluntary hospital, and latterly confined to surgery) and Ailsa Hospital (a psychiatric hospital). University Hospital Ayr, completed in 1991, replaced all but Ailsa Hospital which is still open.

Currently, three hospitals active hospitals lie adjacent to Ayr running along the A713 towards Hollybush in East Ayrshire, these are:
 University Hospital Ayr (general hospital with accident and emergency)
 Ailsa Hospital (mental health hospital)
 The Abbey Carrick Glen Hospital (private hospital)

Hollybush House on the outskirts of Ayr is used by a charity for the mental health welfare of ex-members of the UK Armed Forces.

Ayr has two community centres, these are:
 Heathfield Community Centre
 Lochside Community Centre

Culture and community

Ayr is home to the Gaiety Theatre. Built in 1902, reconstructed after a fire in 1904, its façade remodelled in 1935, and further reinstated after a fire in 1955. In 1995, an annexe was constructed, including a new café, box office, dressing rooms and studio space. After a faltering start, which saw several years as a cinema after WWI, the theatre was bought by Ben Popplewell, from Bradford, who already had a track record of success running the Pavilion theatre on Ayr seafront. For fifty years the Popplewell family ran the theatre – latterly as part of the Glasgow Pavilion business.

During this time the Gaiety developed a reputation as a variety theatre with a 'summer' variety show – the Gaiety Whirl – which ran for 26 weeks at its height. Many British stars appeared regularly on its stage, and several started their careers there. The programme offered more than a summer show, however, with several weeks of Shakespeare and regular transfers from Glasgow Citizens theatre, being part of a varied offer.

After seventy years of private ownership, the local council acquired the Gaiety Theatre freehold in 1974. It then operated as a municipal theatre under direct local authority management.  After many years of successful operation, the theatre began to lose audiences and the council felt the revenue subsidy it provided and the requirement for capital investment required a new approach. In January 2009 the theatre closed, leaving Ayr without a theatre. The closure was met with considerable opposition and dismay among many Ayr residents, particularly since it appeared that the required capital and revenue investment to reopen the theatre would not be available. A public meeting attracted over 400 attendees, the future of the theatre was a key issue in the local press, many Scottish performers expressed their dismay and there was extensive discussion on social media.

In early 2009 South Ayrshire Council invited tenders to take on the theatre management. The Ayr Gaiety Partnership (AGP), a charity formed for the purpose in Summer 2009, secured preferred bidder status. Just over three years later, having secured financial backing from the council and Scottish Government, as well as from local fundraising, AGP took on a 99-year lease of the theatre.

Ayr is served by three libraries plus a mobile library. These are:
 Alloway Library (attached to Alloway Primary school)
 Carnegie Library (main library)
 Forehill Library

The radio station West FM was based in Ayr until mid-2017 and broadcasts on 96.7FM. West FM is the main broadcaster in the Ayrshire area. The Ayrshire Post, serving all parts of Ayrshire, and Ayr Advertiser, serving the towns of Ayr and Prestwick, newspapers are also based in Ayr. The Ayr Advertiser is Scotland's oldest weekly newspaper. West FM's move from Ayr marks the first time in 35 years that local radio has not been broadcast from Ayrshire.

Sport

Ayr Racecourse is a well-known racecourse in Scotland and hosts both National Hunt and flat racing. It has the largest capacity in Scotland for horse racing. Notable events include the Scottish Grand National (April) and Ayr Gold Cup (September) as well as several night meetings. It was recently put up for sale by the owners and included the Western House Hotel as part of the potential sale.

Ayr has two senior football clubs. Ayr United play at Somerset Park in the Scottish Championship. They reached the final of the 2001–02 Scottish League Cup competition. The club was formed in 1910 with the merger of Ayr F.C. (who were formed in 1879 by the merger of Ayr Thistle and Ayr Academical football clubs) and Ayr Parkhouse F.C. Whitletts Victoria are based in the Whitletts area of Ayr and compete in the West of Scotland Football League.

The town has a strong history of ice hockey, but no longer hosts a professional ice hockey team. The most recent professional team were the Ayr Scottish Eagles who played in the British Superleague between 1996 and 2002 based at the Centrum arena. During this time they have success most famously their grand slam season in 1997–98 winning all four titles available and becoming British Champions. The following season saw them compete in the European Hockey league with famous victories home and away to Russian champions AK Bars Kazan. Eagles finished 3rd in a group also containing clubs from Germany and Czech Republic. The Centrum closed in 2003 and was demolished in 2009 to make way for a Sainsbury supermarket.

Ayr's rugby union team, Ayr RFC, play at Millbrae and are reigning Scottish Cup Champions and Scottish Premiership Champions 2012/2013, and won the 2008/09 Scottish Hydro Premiership. Ayr RFC has twice competed in the British and Irish cup involving clubs from Scotland, England, Wales and Ireland. A rugby league team, Ayr Knights ARLFC, play at Auchincruive.

Ayr Curling Club play at the curling rink in Limekiln Road and Ayr's cricket team plays in Cambusdoon, Burns Wicket. Ayr only has one leisure centre, the Citadel, which opened in 1997, at the mouth of the River Ayr and at the seafront at the South Harbour area. This hall can accommodate various sports including 5-a-side football, basketball, volleyball, netball, indoor hockey, indoor cricket practice, badminton and short tennis. As well as individual sports, sporting events and competitions, the hall has hosted exhibitions, concerts, trade fairs, election counts and awards ceremonies. The Citadel is an expansion of the Ayr swimming pool, which opened in 1972. The Citadel features a Dance Studio approx . It is predominantly used for dance or exercise classes but also accommodates martial arts groups and drama workshops and two glass backed squash courts. The Citadel Leisure Centre in Ayr is home to South Ayrshire Volleyball Club as well as being the town's only public swimming pool and diving pool.

The leisure centre has squash courts, a gymnasium, dance studio, cafeteria and adjacent salons and youth club. An Ayrshire basketball team, the Troon Tornadoes, play their national league matches at the Citadel, despite not being an Ayr team. Additionally, Ayr has a Strathclyde league basketball team, Ayr Storm. Ayr is also home to Scottish Bowling. The greens at Northfield host the Bowls Scotland and SYBA finals each year as well as the Hamilton Trophy final. Both the Ladies and Gents World Championships have been held at the Northfield complex as have international series and the Atlantic Rim Championships. Ayr Indoor Bowling Green is the oldest existing indoor bowling stadium in the world. Ayr Cricket Club play at Cambusdoon, and occasionally act as host for Scotland matches.

Speedway was staged at Dam Park in 1937, when two meetings, organised by Maurice and Roland Stobbart from Cumbria took place, featuring riders who raced in the north of England, at venues such as Workington and Hyde Road in Manchester. Ayr has a sandy beach with an esplanade. This is very popular with joggers and day-trippers.
Whitletts Activity Centre also serves the town of Ayr. It has an 11-a side outdoor soccer pitch and an indoor 5-a-side football pitch. Near Whitletts Activity Centre there is also a 5-a-side football complex called "Pro Soccer".

Notable people

 Samuel Aitken, (1878–1930), footballer
 Stevie Brown, Muay thai European champion WKA
 Shaykh Abdalqadir as-Sufi (1930–2021), born Ian Dallas, Shaykh of Instruction, Islamic leader, author, actor
 William D. Brackenridge, (1810–1893), botanist
 Robert Burns, (1759–1796), Scotland's national bard, poet and writer of songs; born in Alloway
 William Dalrymple, (1723–1814) minister and moderator
 Noam Dar (born 1993), professional wrestler
 Sydney Devine (born 1940), singer
 James Morris Gale, (1830-1903) civil engineer for Glasgow Corporation Water Works
 Gavin Gordon, (1901–1970), composer and singer
 William Schaw Lindsay, (1815–1877), British merchant, shipowner, Member of Parliament, military theorist
 John Loudon McAdam, (1756–1836), inventor of Tarmacadam road surface
 Sam McCrory (born 1965), former member of Ulster Defence Association, gay activist
 Drew McIntyre (born 1985), professional wrestler
 Alan McInally (born 1963), footballer, TV pundit
 Thomas McIlwraith (1835–1900), Premier of Queensland, Australia
 Ewan McVicar, DJ
 William Maclure, (1763–1840), geologist, drew 1st geological map of U.S., president of American Geological Society
 Alexander Mathie-Morton (1880–1965), cricketer
 Stuart Murdoch (born 1968), singer-songwriter, Belle & Sebastian
 Sir David Murray (1951), Rangers F.C. chairman
 Simon Alexander Neil, (born 1979), Lead vocalist, guitarist, songwriter for Biffy Clyro
 Neil Oliver (born 1967), BBC presenter of Coast and A History of Scotland
 Alan Reid (born 1954), MP for Liberal Democrats
 Dominic Rigby (born 1970), cricketer
 Mike Scott (born 1958), Lead Singer/Songwriter of The Waterboys
 Robert Shankland (1887–1968), awarded Victoria Cross for his actions at Battle of Passchendaele 1917
 Ronald Stevenson (1938–1999), first-class cricketer
Alex Bell(1882-1934) footballer

Twin towns
Ayr is twinned with:
 Saint-Germain-en-Laye, France since 1984.

In popular culture
The Barns of Ayr features in The Scottish Chiefs.

Freedom of the Burgh
The following people and military units have received the Freedom of the Burgh of Ayr.

Individuals
 Rt Hon Sir Winston Churchill : 1947.

Military Units
 The Royal Scots Fusiliers: 15 June 1946.

See also
Auchincruive Waggonway
Craigie Waggonway
Newton Loch, South Ayrshire – The Newton or Malt Mill and Newton Loch
Wallace's Heel Well – A spring running from the imprint in rock of William Wallace's heel.

Notes

References

Further reading
 Close, R (2005) Ayr A History & Celebration
 Kennedy, R&J (1992) Old Ayr
 Love, D (2003) Ayr Past and Present
 Love, D (2000) Ayr Stories
 Love, D (1995) Pictorial History of Ayr
 Reid, D & Andrew K (2001) Ayr Remembered
 Strawhorn, J (1989) The History of Ayr: Royal Burgh and County Town
 Carmichael, D. (2001) Ayr United Football Club
 Young, A & Reid, D. T. (2011) Ayr as it was, and as it is now. Stenlake Publishing:

External links

 Engraving of a view of Ayr by James Fittler in the digitised copy of Scotia Depicta, or the antiquities, castles, public buildings, noblemen and gentlemen's seats, cities, towns and picturesque scenery of Scotland, 1804 at National Library of Scotland
 A collection of historic maps of Ayr from the 1690s onward at National Library of Scotland
 Engraving of Ayr in 1693 by John Slezer at National Library of Scotland

 
Fishing communities in Scotland
Large burghs
Ports and harbours of Scotland
Royal burghs
County towns in Scotland
Towns in South Ayrshire
Towns with cathedrals in the United Kingdom
Firth of Clyde
Populated coastal places in Scotland